In Islamic culture and Muslim communities throughout the world, magic is "widespread and pervasive". Magic or sorcery (which seeks to alter the course of events usually by calling on a supernatural force) and divination (attempts "to predict future events or gain information about things unseen"), or occultism, encompass a wide range of practices. These include protection from black magic, the evil eye, demons, and evil jinn, which are thought to bring "illness, poverty, and everyday misfortunes"; or alternately practices seeking to bring "good fortune, health, increased status, honor, and power". Techniques include evocation, casting lots, the production of amulets and other magical equipment.  Magic has been called a "vital element of everyday life and practice" in both the contemporary and historical Islamic world, the topics generating a "staggering" amount of "literature.

On the other hand, magic has also been declared by Islamic scholars to be "evil" in any and all of their forms, denying its practitioners entrance into heaven, and earning them a "divinely sanctioned" punishment of death. At least some of this dispute may be explained by how magic, or forbidden magic, is defined; whether natural, or sympathetic magic—which "makes use of the hidden properties (in Arabic: khawass) of natural substances"—is included as forbidden magic.
As of 2005, this division was on display in bookstalls in market places across the Muslim Middle East and North Africa, where "handbooks for practitioners of the occult" were found alongside "books full of warnings and condemnations" of the handbooks' contents.
Over the centuries, magic has "become intricately interwoven with religious elements and practices" in Islamic culture—despite the efforts of orthodox Islamic scholars to stamp it (magic) out—so that the line between what is forbidden and what is allowed has become "blurred".

Terminology

Sihr
The word usually translated as "magic" in the Quran is siḥr.  According to Adam Silverstein, the "Arabic word for 'magic' is siḥr, ... in the Qur'an Siḥr means ... 'black magic,' but in modern Arabic the same word is used for 'entertaining magic.  The Hans Wehr Dictionary of Modern Written Arabic defines siḥr as "bewitchment, beguilement, enchantment, fascination"; and the plural form (ashar) as "sorcery, witchcraft, magic".  
Toufic Fahd in the Brill Encyclopedia of Islam usually uses "magic as the translation of sihr", but "occasionally uses sorcery or witchcraft". Fahd himself first defines sihr as that which leads its subject to "believe that what he sees is real when it is not", but also includes "everything that is known as 'white' or 'natural magic. 
In his examination of what about sihr is haram and what isn't in contemporary Islamic society, Remke Kruk defines the practice of sihr as magic or sorcery, and translates material objects called sihr as "charms".  Emilie Savage-Smith gives a very broad definition including "anything wondrous, including elegant and subtle poetry, ... sleight-of-hand tricks, ... the healing properties of plants, ... invocations to God for assistance, ... invocations to jinn or demons or the spirits of the planets, and on occasion even to the divinatory art of astrology."

Other terms
Toufic Fahd gives a number of definitions of related terms in Encyclopedia.com. Magic/sihr is part of:
Ulūm al-ghayb, "the occult sciences" of Islam, "include divination, astrology, oneiromancy", ... prophecy, magic (siḥr). Fahd further divides Siḥr in three sections: 
Black magic (ʿilm al-siḥr), 
Theurgy (ʿilm al-khawāṣṣ wa-al-ṭalāsim) (theurgy is the practice of rituals, performed with the intention of invoking the action or evoking the presence of one or more deities, especially with the goal of achieving henosis—uniting with the divine—and perfecting oneself); and 
white or natural magic (ʿilm al-ḥiyal wa-al-shaʾwadhah).
Sebastian Günther and Dorothee Pielow list: 
ʿUlum al-ghariba ("occult sciences") or ʿUlum al-hafiya ("secret sciences") as referring to occultism in Islam.

Branches of magic
Some of "the more commonly used branches" of the art of magic listed by Dastghaib Shirazi and/or schools of the occult listed by the Ottoman-Turkic theologian Tasköprüzade:
 ʿIlm akham an nugum—Astrology
 ʿIlm as-Simiya—combines "will-power with particular physical and material forces for manipulating the natural order", and includes "eye-enchantment".  Magic based on imagination, such as enchantments and magic of letters.
 ʿIlm al-Limiya or "the knowledge of subjugation of the spirits"—uses the psyche to bring "higher and stronger spirits" (such as "the spirits of the stars", and jinn) under the control of the magician.
 ʿIlm al-Himiya or talisman—combines "the powers of the higher spiritual world" with the base elements of nature to "produce awe-inspiring effect".
 ʿIlm ar-Rimiya or ash-Sha'badhah—such as "sleight of hand, jugglery", creates the illusion of super-natural effects.
 ʿIlm al-firasa—Predicting the character of a person by his outer appearance.
 ʿIlm ta'bir ar-ru'ya—Interpreting dreams
 ʿIlm at-tillasmat—Talisman
Supplementary fields of magic are:
 ʿIlm al-Kimiya or alchemy—the transmuting (i.e. the attempt to transmute) base metals into gold or silver.
  ʿIlm al-Khafiyah or the hidden knowledge—discovers the names of "the angels or the satans" to be used to invoke those beings. 
Still others (all forbidden) are:
 ʿIlm Shoabada—is the creating of an illusion (such as by moving a burning ball in circles so that it appears to be a circle of fire); "All the fuqaha [Islamic jurists] are unanimous that Shobada ... is a type of magic", and "Harām" (forbidden).
 ʿIlm Taskhirāt—"the method of controlling Angels, Jinns, souls or various wild animals"; is "also Harām and considered a form of sorcery".
 ʿIlm Qayafa—the art of determining the lineage of an individual by use of magic.

Divination
Divination (i.e. "prediction of future events or gaining information about things unseen" by way of an occultic, standardized process or ritual), has been called "a branch of magic" by "Muslim encyclopedists, such as al-Afkānī, Tāshköprüzade, and Ḥājjī Khalīfah", according to Fahd. 
Shia cleric Sayyid Abdul Husayn Dastghaib Shirazi of Al-Islam.com and historian Emilie Savage-Smith calls divination in Islam Kaḥanat—Dastghaib Shirazi specifying that it is where the one predicting uses knowledge obtained from "some groups of Jinns". ("All the jurists are unanimous in their opinion that Kahanat or soothsaying is Harām", according to Dastghaib Shirazi, and all those who go to "a sorcerer, a soothsayer or a liar and testifies to what he says" become infidels, according to the Holy Imam A.S. This is because "Allah the Almighty does not wish people to have knowledge of the future".)

Toufic Fahd describes the difference between divination and magic as blurred. Both share a "practical and nontheoretical character"; use "supernatural means to predict natural elements", and share the technique of obtaining knowledge from "demonic inspiration"; but in "Islamic magical literature", the two "run parallel without mingling".

Other definitions
 Witchcraft—Sources on Islam and magic differ in their use of the term "witchcraft". It is sometimes seems to be used in place of "magic" (Pew Research Center survey on Muslim beliefs), sometimes excluded from use (Toufic Fahd), sometimes avoided in favor of "sorcery" because it (witchcraft) "evokes the wrong associations" (Remke Kruk)—i.e. because it is "a late medieval Christian heresy", or because unlike sorcery it is "a psychic act" that uses no spells, rites or medicines.  G. Hussein Rassool includes witchcraft as a subset of a "wider" definition of magic: "Witchcraft refers to toxic actions that are carried out by persons presumed to have access to the supernatural world."

Beings, afflictions, and tools often involved in magic are:
 Jinn—supernatural creatures in Islam who may be good or evil but who are mentioned frequently in magical works throughout the Islamic world (often mentioned together with devils, i.e. shayāṭīn, and held responsible for misfortune, possession and diseases), to be summoned and bound to a sorcerer. 
 Rūḥanīyah—spiritual beings. Sarʿ—possession by jinn or other spiritsMasruʿ—possessed, also sometimes as 'showing signs of possession'Tilsam, hirz—the "most common Arabic terms" employed for amulets 
 Ruqyah—Kruk defines it as an incantation made up of 41 "Quranic verses, formulas and short chapters". Mission Islam gives a broader definition "the recitation of Qur'an, seeking of refuge, remembrance and supplications that are used as a means of treating sicknesses and other problems" including two types: good, Ar-Ruqyah Ash Shar'eeyah; and bad, Ar Ruqyah Ash Shirkiyah https://www.missionislam.com/health/ruqiyahrecitation.html
Not forbidden is: Karamat—the ability "to perform extraordinary acts" (aka miracles) which is given by God only to those with great "piety and abstinence".

Origins and scriptural basis

Pre-Islamic influence
Scholars of the history of religion have linked several magical practises in Islam with pre-Islamic Turkish and East African customs. Most notable of the Aftrican customs is the Zār. Other pre-Islamic cultures and practises that had influence on early Islamic belief were Jewish, Sabians of the city of Harran, Aramaic, Iraqi practises; the danger and prevention of the evil eye, the astrology and the "special occult properties of plant, animal, and mineral substances" of late antiquity.

Quran

Sixty six Quranic verses reportedly relate to the subject of magic. but the verse dealing with magic in the most detail is Q.2:102. The Quran recognizes the belief in magic and sorcery. The Quran forbids magic and punishes magicians. Most magical descriptions were written in Arabic, because Arabic was assumed to be sacred. In Verse Q.10:2 Muhammad is falsely accused of being a magician by his opponents ("Yet the disbelievers said, 'Indeed, this ˹man˺ is clearly a magician!). Hadiths likewise indicate that magic is not bad per se, but islam is superior to magic. A magician from Mecca heard that Muhammad was called a majnun (possessed by a spirit). When Muhammad proved to him, that he relies on God only and that he is God's messenger, the magician converted to Islam.

Surah al-Isra suggests that the Quran itself bestows barakah (magical blessings) upon hearers and heals them.  In An-Naml (Surah 27), Solomon is described as having the power to speak with animals and jinn, and command birds and devils, (which according to Islam, he only possesses with God's permission).Tafsir Ibn Kathir for surah 21, verse 19 Surah Al-Falaq (Surah 113) is used as a prayer to God to ward off black magic, and according to hadith-literature, was revealed to Muhammad to protect him against Jann, the ancestor of the jinn.

Q.2:102 verse describes magic in a negative light. Its practices are secrets that the humans "ought not to have known".
The description in Q.2:102 of magic as revealed by a pair of Fallen angels (Hārūt and Mārūt), suggests it is, (in the words of Toufic Fahd), a "fragment of a celestial knowledge ...":
{{blockquote|They ˹instead˺ followed the magic promoted by the devils during the reign of Solomon. Never did Solomon disbelieve, rather the devils disbelieved. They taught magic to the people, along with what had been revealed to the two angels, Hârût and Mârût, in Babylon. The two angels never taught anyone without saying, “We are only a test ˹for you˺, so do not abandon ˹your˺ faith.” Yet people learned ˹magic˺ that caused a rift ˹even˺ between husband and wife; although their magic could not harm anyone except by Allah’s Will. They learned what harmed them and did not benefit them—although they already knew that whoever buys into magic would have no share in the Hereafter. Miserable indeed was the price for which they sold their souls, if only they knew!}}

Based on the verse, Irmeli Perho describes magic as "part of God’s creation, like good deeds and bad deeds; like belief and unbelief". Since the magicians "evil actions will only take place if God allows it", magic  is accommodated in the Islamic doctrine of "an omnipotent God".

Muhammad, sira and hadith
In a examination of hadith on magic and witchcraft, Irmeli Perho writes that "magic is seen as a power distinct from God, whereas in the Qurʾān magic is a power that is ultimately subject to God’s will". 

A sahih hadith from Jamiʽ al-Tirmidhi has Muhammad condemning users of magic to death—"The punishment of the Sahir [one who practices magic] is a strike of the sword."

Witchcraft or black magic is mentioned in sira (biography of the Islamic Prophet Muhammad) and hadith (reports about what Muhammad said and did), where Muhammad becomes ill because of an evil doer who uses a magic charm which is hidden "in a well" (in some versions of the story "hair left on the Prophet's comb" and "some other objects" are the charm, in another version "a string with a number of knots upon it"); the Prophet suffered from the magic but prays and receives a dream or a visit from Gabriel to tell him what to do, in the end he is cured through God's power.

One scholar, (Irmeli Perho), notes that all versions of the hadith (and all hadith dealing with witchcraft) signify Islamic belief in the power of magic to harm even so great a man as the Prophet of Islam, but the many different variants of the hadith include different solutions to the curse of the charm—in some God's power against the charm is so great Muhammad does not bother to take the magic object(s) out of the well; in others he is asked if he took them out, if he burned them, if he made a counter spell against the charm. In many hadith he answers “God, He is powerful and great, has already cured me", but in one version that statement is absent and Muhammad is only cured after the charm (a knot) is taken and disassembled—these variients representing (to Irmeli Perho) how Muslims don't all believe magic has the same level of power. In the hadith where Muhammad says "God has already cured me", God’s power is described as "sufficient to counter the power of magic" and only an outsider/enemy is involved in magic, whereas in the latter hadith "human action" was required to counter the magic.  Believers in human action against harmful witchcraft will indicate support for use of "protective spells" and counter spells.

Religious permissibility
The legitimacy of practising magic is rarely discussed, and if, only passing in Islamic law-books.

Ibn Khaldun (1332–1406) brands sorcery, talismans, and prestidigitation as forbidden and illegal. He states that magician's actions are all evil and done for evil, and that they should be put to death. Al-Ghazali, although admitting the reality of magic, regards learning any sort of magic as forbidden. Fakhr al-Din al-Razi (c.1150–1209) "includes under sorcery the use (isti'ana, seeking help) of the hidden properties (khawass) of foodstuffs, medicines and unguents"; but traditional medicines are both widely practiced in the Islamic world and "never subject to religious censorship". 

According to Remke Kruk, the traditional "scholarly definition" of magic distinguishes between natural, or sympathetic magic—which "makes use of the hidden properties (in Arabic: khawass) of natural substances"; and "demoniac magic"—which "involves the help of spirits, usually malevolent spirits (demons)". The first allow the second forbidden. 
Ibn al-Nadim (c.932-c.992) argues that good supernatural powers are received from God after purifying the soul, while sorcerers please devils and sacrifices to demons, committing acts of disobedience.
Al-Razi (1149 or 1150–1209) and Ibn Sina (c. 980–1037), describe magic as merely a tool with the outcome of an act of magic determining whether it is legitimate or not.
Whether or not sorcery/magic is accessed by acts of piety or disobedience is often seen as an indicator whether sorcery/magic is licit or illicit, according to Moiz Ansari. Magic where the mind is directed "toward an object other than God" is forbidden, but utilizing "demons and jinn" to perform magic is not necessarily sinful (according to Toufic Fahd). Fahd quotes Ḥājjī Khalīfah in "summarizing the views of the Muslim theologians": 'The obedience of demons and jinn to humans is not something unimaginable, either from the standpoint of reason or from the standpoint of accepted practice.'
Tabasi (d.1089) offered a wide range of rituals to perform sorcery, but also agreed that only magic in accordance with sharia is permissible.  According to Tobias Nünlist, rather than condemning magic and occultism as whole, Muslim writers on othe subject usually distinguished between licit and illicit occult practises.  According to Henrik Bogdan, Gordan Djurdjevic, contrary to Western esotericism and occultism, there is no clear conflict between orthodoxy and occultism in Islam.

Muhammad ibn Abd al-Wahhab (1703–1792), founder of Wahhabism, considered sorcery as one of the few sins where killing was a "divinely sanctioned punishment".  20th century scholar Muhammad Nasiruddin al-Albani stated that those who have "the conviction that sorcery has effect of its own accord, and not because of God's decision and will", will not enter paradise. 

Wahid 'Abd al-Salam (or Ibn al-Salam) Bali, a popular Wahhabi-trained author of several books on the dangers of jinn and magic, uses "sorcery" (siḥr) to mean "demonic, not on sympathetic magic".  Khawass often refers to "God's holy names and of various Qur'anic texts" and belief that these have a powerful supernatural effect is "very much a part of Islamic daily practice", nonetheless some (Qasim Mahmud al-Mahmud), have denounced "these religious texts also as demonic" and Islamically "unacceptable". (Qasim Mahmud al-Mahmud accused a Islamic healer of the forbidden practice getting help from a jinn after the healer maintained that all fragments of text of the Quran have a 'spirit servant', and if a Muslim reads the appropriate "text a fixed number of times according to the abjad, they "will immediately obtain what they desire".)

Ibn Qayyim al-Jawziyya (1292–1350), a disciple of Ibn Taimiyya, who became the major source for Wahhabism, entirely disregards magic, including exorcisms, as superstition.  During the end of the Ottoman Empire, Muslims started to disregard occult practises as superstition.

Practices and treatments
The categories of practices and treatments mentioned below sometimes overlap, and sometimes are historical and may no longer be either commonly practiced or practiced at all.

Magic
"Most" magic in the early Islamic world was "protective in nature", asking for God's beneficence in general and His intervention specifically against the supernatural powers of the evil eye, shayatin (devils) and jinn, all mentioned in the Quran.  Incantations, spells, evocation, theurgy all involve contacting some spirit/supernatural being/deity and employing them for some purpose.

Incantations and spells

According to Toufic Fahd in encyclopedia.com, "incantations and spells" are "meant to compel the jinn and the demons to accomplish a desired end, by pronouncing the formula `Azamtu ʿalaykum ('I command you')". Nothing about the practice of commanding jinn is found in the Qurʾān or ḥadīth, but Fahd quotes scholar Ḥājjī Khalīfah (1609–1657) defending the practice:
This thing is possible and lawful, according to reason and the law; whoever denies it is not highly regarded, because he winds up failing to acknowledge the omnipotence of God: to subjugate the spirits, to humble them before him, and to make them subordinate to men, is one of the miracles of [God's] creation. 
This practice is lawful in Islam according to Fahd, provided its practitioner does not act "in a manner that is wicked and harmful to others", and does not direct their "mind toward an object other than God".

According to some (Ibn Khaldūn and the Pseudo-Majrīṭī) magical ability is not acquired, but must be something in the magician's "nature", specifically they must have a disposition called al-tibaʿ al-tamm, "the perfect nature"; "the person who possesses it attains 'knowledge of the secrets of creation, of natural causes, and of the mode of being of things.

Evocation of spirits
"Evocation" involves ordering "the spirits of the dead, the demons, and the planets" to carry out the wishes of the magician, (whereas with "incantations and spells" it is jinn and demons who are compelled to obey the magician, according to Toufic Fahd in encyclopedia.com).

"To evoke the spirit of a planet" (Fahd writes), a ritual must be performed where the magician is dressed in the right color ("red-gray for Saturn, white-gray for Jupiter, the yellow-green-red of red-gold for Mars, red-gold for Venus, a mixture of all colors for Mercury, and green-white for the Moon"), perfumed with the "scent" of the planet, has consumed the right "essence and flavor" of the planet, mounted an "image of whatever it is one plans to ask of the spirit invoked", and then waited for the right moment in the zodiac.

Theurgy
The difference between magic and theurgy (ʿilm al-khawāṣṣ wa-al-ṭalāsim) is (according to Ibn Khaldūn), that 
the sorcerer does not need any aid, while those who work with talismans seek the aid of the spiritualities of the stars, the secrets of numbers, the particular qualities of existing things, and the positions of the sphere that exercise an influence upon the world of the elements, as the astrologers maintain. The philosophers, therefore, say that sorcery is a union of spirit with spirit, while the talisman is a union of spirit with body.

Talisman
According to Ḥājjī Khalīfah, the art of talismanry (al-Himiya) is intended

to combine the active celestial forces with the passive earthly forces at moments favorable to the desired action and influence, with the help of vapors [able] to strengthen and attract the spirit of the talisman, with the intent of producing unusual manifestations in the world of generation and decay. In comparison with magic, this science is more accessible, for both its principles and its causes are known. Its usefulness is obvious, but mastery comes only after a great deal of effort.

According to Savage-Smith, the amulets and talismanic objects (there being no difference between them) used by early Muslims "chiefly took the form of pious invocations to God, through Quranic quotations and prayers", and were used "to ward off the evil eye and misfortune", and to gain good fortune, increase fertility, "potency or attractiveness".  Early talismanic objects "reflect pre-Islamic magical symbolism" and contain symbols such as a "long horned stag", oryx, scorpion, lion or dog, stars, "a frame of pseudo-writing"; and magic squares.

White or Natural Magic
According to Ḥājjī Khalīfah,  natural magic (al-shaʾwadhah) "involves imaginary phenomena ... aerial illusions, atmospheric vapors, playing with fire, tricks with bottles, cups, and glasses, illusions with eggs, fruits produced out of season, wax figures, animal taming, discovery of hidden objects, preparation of magic ink, and so on", often concocted from mixtures of "natural essences, ointments, liquified materials, or even special words with suggestive powers".  Savage-Smith describes "confidence tricks, sleight-of-hand trick" using "lamps, candles, vapours, bottles, cups and glasses, eggs," etc., as "magic as trickery and conjuring" practiced by disreputable individuals in medieval Islamic times.

Black magic and love sorcery
According to Remke Kruk, while traditional handbooks of magic, such as ones "circulated under the name 'al-Buni' 
and their later offshoots", including a work referred to as the 'Diyarbi book', are full of information on how "khawass, hidden properties, of various Qur'an chapters and verses and of God's holy names" can be put to work in invocations, but "all these books contain instructions" on harming other people. They contain information "not only about how to banish, but also about how to destroy and kill enemies and how to drive people", such as married or unmarried couples, "apart (tafriq)" invoking angels and/or jinn. These practices are condemned by orthodox Muslims.

Wonderworking and marvels
Savage-Smith writes that "by the thirteenth century" in the Islamic world "there were manuals of sorcery giving spells for flying, for becoming invisible, for walking on water, for giving someone a dog's head", and other "amazing things".

Evil eye (prevention against)
The evil eye, (  al-ʿayn, also ,), where misfortune befalls someone after another person has looked at them, usually with feelings of jealousy is recognized by Ibn Sīnā and Ibn Khaldūn.
Ibn Sīnā explains the evil eye as "an admiring tendency of the soul that exercises [the evil eye], by this property, a weakening influence on the object of its admiration" [the victim of the evil eye]   According to Islam Question and Answer fatwa site, (according to Muhammad) the second greatest cause of death among Muslims is the evil eye:  'Most of those who die among my ummah (Muslim community) die because of the will and decree of Allaah, and then because of the evil eye.'

For Ibn Khaldūn, the effect is
natural and innate. It cannot be left alone. It does not depend on the free choice of its possessor. It is not acquired by him. [It is] an influence exercised by the soul of the person who has the evil eye. A thing or situation appears pleasing to the eye of a person, and he likes it very much. This [circumstance] creates in him envy and the desire to take it away from its owner. Therefore he prefers to destroy him.

Exorcism

According to Dawn Perlmutter, writing in 2013, "an entire industry of professional exorcists" has arisen in "the Middle East and among Western Muslims", performing Qur'anic healing, posting on YouTube and advertising on Facebook and Twitter. In Islamic literature there are detailed treatises that include "entire exorcism rites and purification rituals for the destruction of amulets and other magical items" to neutralize black magic.

Divination

In the early and classical Islamic world divination (gaining information about future events or things unseen by occult methods) encompassed a range of techniques, "grouped roughly" into those "largely intuitive" (for example, water diviners observed the behaviour of animals, such as the hoopoe, to discover "the presence of underground water") and those employing "numerical or mechanical methods". interpreting the will of God by examining "the conformation of animal parts"; the patterns appearing on the
"surface of water, oil, or ink, (hydromancy); dream interpretation (oneiromancy); "Few details remain of the specific methods" used in these intuitive techniques.  Predicting changes in weather patterns "based on the visibility of important star-groups", was the subject of a tract by al-Kindi c. 801–873 CE) and another tract "is still in circulation today, at least in Iraq".

In modern times in the Middle East, "fortunetelling", according to Dawn Perlmutter,
focuses more on spiritual protection and family counseling than prediction and prophecy. In addition to reading cards, dice, palms, and coffee grounds, activities include selling amulets to ward off evil spirits and providing advice for marital problems. In Afghanistan, fortunetellers operate out of small shops or outside of mosques and shrines across the country but are rarely consulted to portend the future; most often their clients are women or the elderly seeking guidance for problems affecting their families. In Iran and Pakistan this fortunetelling is also widespread.

Physiognomy
Divining using "specific parts of the human body" (physiognomy), such as twitching eyelids or other involuntary movements, "the shape and appearance of the hands, joints, and nails" (`ilm al-kaff) and chiromancy or palmistry (employing lines on the hands - ʿilm al-asārīr), "were, and still are popular" in the Muslim world. Physiognomy does not try to align "physical characteristics with character traits" but to use them to read the future. Twitching eyelids, for example, would not indicate a nervous personality but might foretell "the success or failure of an enterprise".

Astrology

In Islamic history, Astrology (ʿilm al-nujūm, "the science of the stars"), was "by far" the most popular of the "numerous practices attempting to foretell future events or discern hidden things", according to Savage-Smith. It has several sub categories: 
the relatively simple "non-horoscopic astrology" that involves "the prediction of events based upon the rising or setting of certain star groups"; 
"judicial astrology" involving "calculating the positions of planets and the mathematical production of horoscopes" 
to determine the fate of individuals, countries, or dynasties, 
of "auspicious and inauspicious days"; and 
to answer specific questions—the location of lost objects, buried treasure, or "the diagnosis and prognosis of disease".

Sortilege
Sortilege, or practice of casting lots and interpreting the results produced by chance (qurʿa), was used both to predict the future, and "as a means of determining a course of action or deciding between courses of action".  While casting lots was "considered legitimate" in Islam, according to Savage-Smith, two practices involving chance are prohibited by the Quran: 
istiqsam—a pre-Islamic "use of rods to settle disputes or give simple omens"; 
maysir ("the game of the left-handed"), "involving arrows and the slaughtering of animals".

Letter number interpretation
Using the "numerical values of letters" to form a word (ʿilm al-ḥurūf) has been used as divination. Treatises on divination maintained that "the victor and vanquished" of some battle or event could be determined by "calculating the numerical value of the names of the contenders, dividing each by nine, and finding the remainders on the chart". More complicated techniques involved combining the letters of one of the 99 names of God "with those of the name of the desired object" (jafr). An "even more" complicated form involved creating an "intricate circular chart ... concentric circles, letters of the alphabet, elements of astrology, and poetry" and calculating "the degree of the ecliptic on the eastern horizon".

Approved treatments
Magic or traditional healing without any dispute and approved by orthodox scholars includes

Miracles
Miracles belong to licit magic and are considered gifts of God. According to Ibn Khaldūn,
The difference between miracles and magic is this: a miracle is a divine power that arouses in the soul [the ability] to exercise influence. The [worker of miracles] is supported in his activity by the spirit of God. The sorcerer, on the other hand, does his work by himself and with the help of his own psychic power, and, under certain conditions, with the support of devils. The difference between the two concerns the idea, reality, and essence of the matter.

According to contemporary Shia cleric Sayyid Abdul Husayn Dastghaib Shirazi, the ability "to perform extraordinary acts" (miracles) or Karamat happens because of the great "piety and abstinence" of the miracle worker and is not sinful (according to Dastghaib Shirazi), provided there can be no question that the performer of the miracle
"is invoking God", 
is "the most righteous and knowledgeable person of his time",
and does not claim to be a prophet.

Quranic treatment
"Quranic treatment" is made up of practices based "exclusively" on "reciting Qur'anic texts, and defining exactly what this implies". 
Elements of the 'Qur'anic treatment include "talking about the patient's troubles", recitation of ruqyah—i.e specific Quranic verses (and dua) (see notes below) and prolonging the treatment "if no progress is observed".  Though based on revealed scripture and religious belief, parts of the treatment also have "obvious psychotherapeutic value"—recitation of scripture the patient believes to be divine, emphasis on the patient talking about their problems, "repetition of simple rituals within a well-defined time schedule over a certain period of time"—and as of 2005, was "highly fashionable" even among the Muslim elite in places like Cairo.

In Muslim society

According to a Pew Research Center survey conducted in 2011–2012 of Muslims around the world, a majority of Muslims surveyed in the Middle East North Africa, Turkey, South Asia, and Southeast Asia believe in Jinn—However, less than 20% of those surveyed thought that making offerings to jinn was an "acceptable part of Islamic tradition".  Belief in talismans, witchcraft and spiritual healers, was not as widespread, ranging from one half to a quarter of Muslims in these regions. More religious Muslims are more likely to believe in jinn, talismans and other supernatural entities.

Popular practices v. religious orthodoxy
Scholar Remke Kruk found books on magic and sorcery "extremely well represented" in "street stalls and bookshops" in the Muslim world from Marrakesh to Cairo to Yemen circa 2005. Practical handbooks on the subject were common, but with the "orthodox" Islamic revival, "religious pamphlets condemning various practices" also became popular, starting around 1990.  G. Hussein Rassool states that 
Throughout the Muslim world, there are sorcerers, fortune tellers and traditional healers; many are in violation of interpretations of the Shari’ah (Islamic law). This leads the magicians or healers that use magic or witchcraft into the realm of major Shirk which refers to the association of a partner with Allah, the summoning other than God and relying on others beside Allah.

Kruk writes that "over the centuries" the Islamic scholars of "official Islam" have worked to forbid magical practices, but despite their efforts magic practices have "become intricately interwoven with religious elements and practices" in Islamic culture.  Consequently, the line between forbidden and allowed "is so blurred that neither the practitioner nor the client" are often aware of when they are crossing that line.

On the one hand, practices approved by strict Islamic conservatives (called "orthodox" by Kruk) and revivalists to counteract magic include things like the use of water "over which the Quran has been recited" or to which have been added "salt, rose essence, oil of black caraway, or the leaves of the lote tree". On the other, in traditionally practised "magic and sorcery" now under attack from those strict conservatives, recitation of the 99 names of God and verses of the Quran play "a major part".

The practice of many Islamic healers who claim to talk to jinn for the purpose of curing and preventing the evil eye and exorcism of possession by jinn, is believed to be the extremely serious sin of shirk (mentioned above) by more strict/conservative/orthodox Muslims.  Kruk points out how fine the differences between approved and disapproved practices can be—it is acceptable to get in touch with jinn "in exorcisms" to threaten them, but it is shirk to ask their help in a healing; dissolving Quranic texts written on paper in water is forbidden, but "writing in bowls with ink that is washed off by the water poured into the bowl", is recommended by the well known conservative, Wahabbi-oriented cleric Wahid 'Abd al-Salam Bali.
Kruk worries that the rise of stricter forms of Islam has led to an attack on healing "practices that used to be well integrated into Islamic life".

Cases and punishments
According to Ahmed Ferky Ibrahim, (professor of Islamic law at McGill University), while "capital punishment for magic is rooted in Islamic history", it was seldom applied historically. "When you read 16th- through 19th-century Ottoman court records, for instance, you realize there was no inquisition of magicians, no witch hunts, as was the case in Christian Europe ...The frequent persecution of magicians is indeed a recent phenomenon".

As of 2013, "stricter laws, arrests, and executions have resulted in efforts to deter magical practices" in "Afghanistan, Gaza, Bahrain, and Saudi Arabia". Sorcery is also a crime in Nigeria. 

Saudi Arabia
In Saudi Arabia (prior to the reign of Muhammad bin Salman), Harry Potter books were "forbidden" and men and women have been beheaded on charges of sorcery. 
In 2009, a special "Anti-Witchcraft Unit" was "created and formalized", not only to investigate and pursue alleged witches, but to "neutralize their cursed paraphernalia, and disarm their spells". In that year, in just one region (Makkah) alone, "at least 118 people were charged with 'practicing magic' or 'using the book of Allah in a derogatory manner. By 2011, the Anti-Witchcraft Unit had established nine witchcraft-fighting bureaus in cities across the Saudi, and processed "at least 586 cases of magical crime".
In 2007, an Egyptian pharmacist, Mustafa Ibrahim, was beheaded in Riyadh after being convicted on charges of "practicing magic and sorcery" as well as other charges.
In 2008, police went to the trouble of luring a well-known Lebanese television psychic, Ali Hussain Sibat, into a sting operation while he was in Saudi on hajj (pilgrimage to Mecca). He was sentenced to death but had his sentenced reduced to 15 years in prison "after outcry from international human rights organizations".  In September 2011 a Sudanese man was beheaded, having been caught in another sting operation "set in motion by the religious police".
Human rights workers allege that accused in Saudi Arabia are often foreign domestic workers from Africa and Southeast Asia who often are simply practicing folk medicine from their country or who are charged with witchcraft by their employers in retaliation for taking those employers to court for refusal to pay wages. (The power of the Committee for the Prevention of Vice and Promotion of Virtue that oversees the anti-witchcraft unit has been sharply curtailed under the reign of crown prince Muhammad bin Salman.)

Iran
In Iran in 2011, 25 advisers and aides of the then President Mahmoud Ahmadinejad and his chief of staff Esfandiar Rahim Mashaei were arrested on charges of practising sorcery and black magic.
According to "the top sorcerer among Iran's ruling elite" (top "according to associates clients and government officials"),  Ahmadinejad met with him "at least twice" (Ahmadinejad denies the charges), and was just one among "dozens" of high Iranian government officials" who consult him on "matters of national security". The "top" sorcerer (claims to) regularly contact Jinn who "work for Israel's intelligence agency, the Mossad, and for the U.S. Central Intelligence Agency", and has had 'a long battle to infiltrate the Israeli jinn and find out what they know.  The sorcerer also claimed that not only did jinn work for the US and Israel, but that some were being used by him "to infiltrate" the intelligence agencies of Israeli and U.S.

Gaza
In Gaza, exorcism is not illegal but treated with considerable suspicion by the Islamist ruling Hamas party, which claimed to have "exposed thirty cases of fraud" in one year, 2010.
Dubai
The BBC relates the story of a charismatic Mali-born confidence artist (Foutanga Babani Sissoko) who convinced the bank manager at Dubai Islamic Bank (Mohammed Ayoub) that he, Sissoko, using black magic, "could take a sum of money and double it" ("... he saw lights and smoke. He heard the voices of spirits. Then there was silence").  Between 1995 and 1998 Ayoub made 183 transfers into bank accounts of Sissoko—eventually totaling 890 million dirhams or $242 million—"expected it to come back in double the amount." However, after a time the Bank's auditors "began to notice that something was wrong" and Sissoko (who had left Dubai for the U.S. and then Mali) stopped answering Ayoub's calls.  Eventually the Dubai government covered the banks loses and Ayoub was convicted of fraud and sentenced to three years in prison. Rumour had it "he was also forced to undergo an exorcism, to cure him of his belief in black magic."

Pakistan
In Pakistan it is common to slaughter an animal to ward off evil and bad luck, it is especially efficacious is sacrificing a black goat. In December 2016, after 48 people died in the crash of a propeller-driven Pakistan International Airlines plane, a group of airline staff were seen slaughtering a black goat on the tarmac of Islamabad’s airport.
This practice is not restricted to the lower echelon of Pakistani society. When he was President of Pakistan, Asif Ali Zardari had a black goat sacrificed at his house every day to ward off black magic and the evil eye. (61% of Pakistani Muslim surveyed believe in the evil eye according to a 2012 Pew report.)  Zardari was also known to seek the advice of a spiritual healer on when and where it was auspicious to travel.
ISIS
In Syria in January 2015 ISIS beheaded a male street performer ("known for entertaining locals with ... magic tricks like making coins and cell phones disappear") in a public square. (Although Adam Silverstein suggests this may be less strict enforcement than ISIS's confusion over the definition of sihr).

Methods of counteracting sorcery approved by scholars
As a "good representative" of the kind of literature attacking the practice of magic, Kruk cites a popular, widely available book (al-Sarim al-Battar fi tasaddi li-l-sahara al-ashrar), on "how to deal with sorcery and its evil effects", written from an orthodox and strict Wahhabi viewpoint, by Saudi shaykh Wahid 'Abd al-Salam (or Ibn al-Salam ) Bali.   
The book calls for 
treating sihr al-junan (madness-sorcery), sihr al-khumul (apathy-sorcery), various sexual afflictions, by incantations to drive out the jinn that is occupying the victim's brain or other parts of his body; or  
treating inability to have intercourse with your wife by urinating on the heated blade of a sharp axe.
treating a stomach ache by drinking water "over which Qur'anic passages have been recited".
describing sihr al-nazif (sorcery which allegedly causes vaginal bleeding outside menstruation and may go on for months) as being brought about by 'a trampling of the devil on one of the veins in the womb'. Its treatment is drinking water over which a "Qur'anic incantation has been recited", and taking baths in the water "for three days". 
treating the evil eye (which is not caused by jinn) with "ritual bathing" and "pious incantations".
 "foremost" among the ruqa (spells and incantations) allowed to be recited into the ear of the afflicted by Islamic healers is the ruqya; an incantation made up of 41 "Quranic verses, formulas and short chapters".

Shia cleric Sayyid Abdul Husayn Dastghaib Shirazi, who states on his webpage on Al-Islam that "a Muslim who indulges in magic and does not repent is punished by death", goes on to affirm that "many" Islamic jurists are of the opinion that "countering one magic spell by another is permitted", and gives examples of how   
‘ʿAlī ibn Abī Ṭālib (the first Shia Imam and fourth Rashidun caliph) told a victim of witchcraft to carry a prayer of invocation/supplication written "on the skin of deer" and always keep it with him; 
how Abbas the Safawid compelled a Christian to convert to Islam using tasbih (prayer beads) "made of dust from Imam Husain (a.s.)’s grave", (both sounding very much like magic charms).

See also
 Christian views on magic
 Islam and astrology
 Spirit possession and exorcism in Islam
 Sufism
 Superstitions in Muslim societies
 Witchcraft and divination in the Hebrew Bible

References

Notes

Citations

Sources and bibliography

Fahd, T., "Siḥr", in: Encyclopaedia of Islam, Second Edition, Edited by: P. Bearman, Th. Bianquis, C.E. Bosworth, E. van Donzel, W.P. Heinrichs. Consulted online on 2 December 2021   First published online: 2012.  First print edition: , 1960-2007

 
Witchcraft
Magic (supernatural)
Sociology of religion
Religious controversies
Islamic law